Corinthian Jack is a 1921 British adventure film directed by Walter Courtney Rowden and starring Victor McLaglen, Kathleen Vaughan and Warwick Ward. It was based on a novel by Charles E. Pearce.

Cast
 Victor McLaglen - Jack Halstead 
 Kathleen Vaughan - Nyra Seaton 
 Warwick Ward - Sir Philip Tenbury 
 Dorothy Fane - Lady Barbara 
 Malcolm Tod - Lord Walsham 
 Conway Dixon - Col Dane 
 William Lenders - Weare 
 Roy Raymond - Mike

References

External links
 

1921 films
Films directed by Walter Courtney Rowden
1921 adventure films
British silent feature films
British black-and-white films
British adventure films
1920s English-language films
1920s British films
Silent adventure films